The Lianmuqin Formation, also transcribed as Lianmugin Formation, is an Early Cretaceous geologic formation composed of "interbedded red green and yellow variegated mudstones and siltstones". Dinosaur remains have been recovered from it.

The formation is named after Lianmuqin Town in Shanshan County, Xinjiang.

Vertebrate paleofauna

Dinosaurs

Pterosaurs

Crurotarsans

See also 
 List of dinosaur-bearing rock formations
 List of stratigraphic units with few dinosaur genera

References

Bibliography 
 

Geologic formations of China
Lower Cretaceous Series of Asia
Cretaceous China
Barremian Stage
Aptian Stage
Albian Stage
Mudstone formations
Sandstone formations
Lacustrine deposits
Paleontology in Xinjiang